Harbourside Football Club is a Canadian semi-professional soccer club based in Nanaimo, British Columbia that plays in League1 British Columbia.

History
The club was officially unveiled on October 19, 2022, as an expansion club in League1 British Columbia for the 2023 season in both the men's and women's division. The club will have an affiliation with youth club Nanaimo United FC, as well as Vancouver Island University. Their home field will be at the Q’unq’inuqwstuxw Stadium of Nanaimo District Secondary School, with a capacity of 1500, with a goal of eventually expanding to a capacity of 3500. The club will debut on April 29, 2023 against Unity FC in League1 British Columbia in both the men's and women's divisions.

References

Soccer clubs in British Columbia
Harbourside
Association football clubs established in 2022
2022 establishments in British Columbia